The prime minister of Fiji is the head of government of the Republic of Fiji. The prime minister is appointed under the terms of the 2013 Constitution. The prime minister is the head of the Cabinet and appoints and dismisses ministers.

Description of the office
As a former British colony, Fiji has largely adopted British political models and follows the Westminster, or Cabinet, system of government, in which the executive branch of government is responsible to the legislature. Under the 2013 Constitution, the prime minister is the leader of the political party which has won more than half of the total number of seats in Parliament. If no such party exist, the Parliament elects the prime minister.

The prime minister of Fiji is technically the "first among equals," whose vote in meetings of the Cabinet carries no greater weight than that of any other minister. In practice, the prime minister dominates the government. Other ministers are appointed by the prime minister.

History of the office
Ratu Sir Kamisese Mara was appointed Fiji's first prime minister on 10 October 1970, when Fiji attained its independence from Britain. Mara previously served as Fiji's first and only chief minister, from 20 September 1967 (while Fiji still was a British colony). Mara's first term as prime minister lasted until 13 April 1987. He returned to the office for the second term on 5 December 1987, serving until 2 June 1992. As of 2014, Mara is the longest-serving prime minister of Fiji.

List of prime ministers of Fiji (1970–present)

|- style="text-align:center;"
! colspan=9| Prime Ministers of the Dominion of Fiji

|- style="text-align:center;"
| colspan=9| Vacant (14 May 1987 – 5 December 1987)
|- style="text-align:center;"
! colspan=9| Prime Ministers of the Republic of Fiji

|- style="text-align:center;"
| colspan=9| Vacant (27 May 2000 – 4 July 2000)

Birthplaces

Timeline

See also
 List of heads of state of Fiji
 President of Fiji
 Office of the Prime Minister
 Premier of the Kingdom of Viti

Notes

References

External links 
 

Fiji, List of Prime Ministers of

Prime Minister
1970 establishments in Fiji